Jenny Gröllmann (5 February 1947 – 9 August 2006) was a German actress, best known for her work on films I Was Nineteen (1968), Peas at 5:30 (2004) and her recurring role on the show Polizeiruf 110. She won an Ernst Zinna Prize of the city of Berlin in 1974.

Biography
Gröllmann was born in Hamburg, the daughter of Gertrud, a theater photographer and Otto, stage designer.

In 1949, the family moved to the Soviet zone of occupation in Schwerin and in 1955 they moved to Dresden, where the father had been given a new job.

In 1961, she played the main role in Bertolt Brecht's play The Visions of Simone Machard.

Death 
Gröllmann died of breast cancer on 6 August 2006 in Berlin. She was 59 years old.

Selected filmography 
Netzwerk (1970)
Peas at 5:30 (2004)
Broddi 1975

References

External links

 

1947 births
2006 deaths
20th-century German actresses
Actresses from Hamburg
German film actresses
German television actresses
Deaths from cancer in Germany
Deaths from breast cancer